Universal church or Universal Church may refer to:

 One of the Four Marks of the Church
 The Catholic Church (the word catholic means "universal") 
 Christian Church, the whole body of Christians collectively
 Ecumenism
 Christian universalism
 Trinitarian universalism
 Unitarian Universalism
Universalist Church of America
 Universal Church of the Kingdom of God
 Universal Church of Truth